Miyabenol C is a stilbenoid. It is a resveratrol trimer. It is found in Vitis vinifera (grape), in Foeniculi fructus (fruit of Foeniculum vulgare), in Caragana sinica.

It shows protein kinase C inhibitor activity.

Foeniculoside I is a glucoside of cis-miyabenol C.

References

External links 
 Miyabenol C at www.plant-expert.com

Resveratrol oligomers
Natural phenol trimers

Protein kinase inhibitors
Grape